Robin White may refer to:

 Robin White (journalist) (born 1944), BBC journalist and playwright
 Robin White (artist) (born 1946), New Zealand artist
 Robin White (tennis) (born 1963), professional tennis player
 Robin White (footballer) (born 1960), Australian rules footballer
 Robin Bantry White (born 1947), Irish Anglican priest